Derek Mountford (24 March 1934 – January 1994) was an English former footballer who played for Port Vale, Crewe Alexandra, Northwich Victoria and Stafford Rangers in the 1950s.

Career
Mountford graduated through the Port Vale juniors to sign with the club as a professional in May 1951. He played the last two Second Division games of the 1954–55 season, and made his debut at Vale Park on 30 April, in a 1–0 win over Rotherham United. He played 15 games in the 1955–56 campaign, but soon fell out of manager Freddie Steele's first team plans. He featured in nine league and two FA Cup games in the 1956–57 season, but was released by new boss Norman Low in July 1957 after the "Valiants" suffered relegation. He then played 13 Third Division North games for nearby Crewe Alexandra as Maurice Lindley's "Railwaymen" finished bottom of the Football League in 1957–58. He then departed Gresty Road and later played for non-league sides Northwich Victoria and Stafford Rangers.

Career statistics
Source:

References

1934 births
1994 deaths
Footballers from Stoke-on-Trent
English footballers
Association football midfielders
Port Vale F.C. players
Crewe Alexandra F.C. players
Northwich Victoria F.C. players
Stafford Rangers F.C. players
English Football League players